Spofforth railway station was a station on the Harrogate–Church Fenton line in Spofforth, North Yorkshire.

History

The station opened on 10 August 1847 as the temporary terminus of the line from Church Fenton, because engineering works between Spofforth and Harrogate, which included the Prospect Tunnel and the Crimple Valley Viaduct, had not been finished at this date. Horse-drawn omnibuses provided onward transport to Harrogate until the remainder of the line to Harrogate Brunswick station was opened to traffic on 20 July 1848, and Spofforth became a through station.

In the early 20th century, barley was the main freight handled at the station. In the 1950s, general goods and livestock (including horses and prize cattle) were handled here, and the station offered the carriage of motor cars by train.

The station was closed completely on 6 January 1964, and by 1971 most of the buildings had been demolished. The area has been overbuilt in the mid-1990s, and the housing development of Station Court now occupies the site.

Location

The station was located at the level crossing with today's A661 road at the southern end of the village. West of it, near Spofforth Castle, a short viaduct with five spans of about  height and slightly over  length led the line across a hollow. It is still standing, but in a deteriorating condition. Between Spofforth and Wetherby York Road, close to the latter station, was the triangular junction with the Cross Gates–Wetherby line.

Facilities
The station had two side platforms. The station building, designed by George Townsend Andrews and similar to that of Ruswarp, stood on the up platform. The down platform had a wooden waiting room of standard NER design. The signal box was located on the south-eastern side of the level crossing on the down side of the line. The main goods yard was located behind the down platform and was accessed from the west. Its two sidings served a stone-built goods shed and a loading dock. A cattle dock on the up side was served by a third siding north-west of the crossing. Two more sidings on the up side, serving the coal yard, branched off south-east of the level crossing.

References

Disused railway stations in North Yorkshire
Beeching closures in England
Railway stations in Great Britain opened in 1847
Railway stations in Great Britain closed in 1964
Former York and North Midland Railway stations
George Townsend Andrews railway stations
Spofforth, North Yorkshire